Nico Felicien Declercq (Kortrijk (Belgium), 27 December 1975) is a physicist and mechanical engineer. He is a professor with the Georgia Institute of Technology in Atlanta and Georgia Tech Lorraine in France. He is specialized in ultrasonic nondestructive evaluation of materials, propagation of ultrasonic waves in highly complex materials, in acoustics, in theoretical and experimental linear and nonlinear ultrasonics, acousto-optics, Medical Physics and Acoustic Microscopy. He has investigated the acoustics of Chichen Itza and Epidaurus.

Education, career and awards 
Declercq received his BSc and MSc in physics (with a major in astrophysics) from the Katholieke Universiteit Leuven in 1996 and 2000, respectively, and received a PhD in engineering physics from Ghent University in 2005. He worked as a Belgian National Science Foundation (FWO Vlaanderen) postdoctoral fellow with Ghent University and has been a visiting scientist, supported by NATO, at the National Center for Physical Acoustics at the University of Mississippi, before joining Georgia Tech in 2006.

Declercq received the International Dennis Gabor Award from the NOVOFER Foundation of the Hungarian Academy of Sciences on December 21, 2006. He received the ICA Early Career Award "For outstanding contributions to ultrasonics, particularly for studies of propagation and diffraction of acoustic waves" from the International Commission for Acoustics in 2007.

Declercq has been president (2013-2015) of the steering board of the International Congress on Ultrasonics, as well as president of their 2015 congress. He is an associate editor of the journal Acta Acustica united with Acustica, associate editor of the Journal of Nondestructive Evaluation, and founding editor-in-chief of Elsevier's Physics in Medicine. He serves on technical committees of the French Acoustical Society and is the Chair of the Ultrasonics Technical Committee of the European Acoustics Association.
As Georgia Tech Professor, Declercq has received several Teaching Excellence Awards.

Connections with the Indian sub-continent 
In India, Declercq is a respected scientist. Given his background in astrophysics, acoustics, and acousto-optics, he was honored, in 2019, to inaugurate the Aryabhatt Auditorium. The auditorium is named after Indias mathematician-astronomer Aryabhatt. It belongs to the "Prof. Rajendra Singh (Rajju Bhaiya) Institute of Physical Sciences for Study and Research" at the VBSPU University at Jaunpur, which is named after Rajju Bhaiya, a pupil of Nobel Prize laureate C.V. Raman. 
In 2008 Declercq wrote a book on ultrasonics, together with his Indian colleagues P.C. Mishra, Rajendra Kumar Singh, and Sri Singh.
In Sri Lanka, a country which he visits regularly, he has family bonds and is a frequently invited speaker at the nation’s institutes of higher education.
He is also known as a scholar of the history of India and Sri Lanka.
In 2022, he was named Physics Professor Honoris Causa at the University of Allahabad, India.

Coat of arms and lineage 
 
Declercq's coat of arms consists of the following elements:

Motto: Érudit et sage à pied levé  (English: educated and wise on a raised foot)

Blazon:
on the bordure a compone of 14 pieces gold and azure of which five at the top, an azur shield, having a silver crane with raised foot, membered and beaked in red, holding in the right foot an upright feather in gold, accompanied in chief by two six-pointed stars and at the bottom a sun in gold (original blazon in French: A la bordure componnée de quatorze pièces d’or et d’azur dont cinq au chef, un écusson d’azur, a une grue d’argent sur pied, membrée et becquée de gueules, tenant de la patte dextre une plume d’oie taillée d’or posée en pal, accompagnée en chef de deux étoiles radiée de 6 pointes d’or et en ponte un soleil d'or.)

Crest: A rising silver swan with red beak (original crest in French: un cygne éployé d'argent et becquée de gueules)

Origin: The coat of arms contains colours and elements referring to that of Declercq’s ancestors de Patin (a Flemish family originating in the 14th century in Cambrai, France), with shield placed in front of the original shield (in catalan: Cortado Jaquelado de oro y azur, 2º, de azur, dos palos de oro) of his Spanish paternal ancestors Desclergues (originating in the 16th century in Catalunya, Spain).

Declercq is a patrilineal descendant of Don Pere Desclergue (I), who was born early in the 15th century AD at Montblanc in the Conca de Barberà in Catalunya, Spain. Pere Desclergue's grandson Bonaventura Desclergue (II) i Cortés, a notary at Montblanc, had four sons, one of which would stay as heir at Montblanc, while the three others (Jeroni, Antoni (I) and Enric) would go to Flanders as military during the Eighty-year war. Don Jeroni Desclergue had been a military since 1587. He stayed in Flanders from 1587-1598 and 1601-1604. In 1587, he became a commander in the infantry company of Lluís de Queralt (a Catalan); while in Flanders he joined the company of Diego de Durango, in the tercio of Luis del Villar. It has been reported that he was involved in military interventions in Holland, Flanders and France, including the Siege of Cambrai of 1595.
On March 10 of 1597 he captured, with his company, the city of Amiens and helped further defending it against the French. On January 14 of 1598 he was recognized for his military career by his captain Diego de Durango.  Once returned to Barcelona, he went to the service of the Viceroy Duke of Feria. His stay in Barcelona allowed him to attend, with his father Bonaventura Desclergue (II) and his elder brother Francesc Desclergue, in the Cortes of Barcelona of 1599.  In 1602 he returned to Flanders in August, where he commanded as Tercio captain of a company of Iñigo de Borja, with which he participated in the Siege of Ostend (August 1601 - September 27 of 1604), where he died, with half of his company, while leading an assault, as a result of the explosion of a mine, on 4 September of 1604, which also wounded his brother Enric Desclergue.  Enric was awarded for his military achievements and died in 1631. Antoni appeared in contemporary literature which shows that he went back and forth to Spain, while Jeroni’s grandson, Antoni, was the continuator of the Desclergue bloodline in Flanders through his marriage, in Flanders, with Martina de la Cruz in 1656. Bonaventura Desclergues (II) is the one who established the monumental 'Casal dels Desclergue’, or ’la Casa Desclergues’ on the Plaza Mayor of Montblanc; Nico Declercq stems from Jeroni Desclergue twelve generations later. DNA analysis shows that the Desclergues of Montblanc originate from Bertrand du Guesclin, who was a military commander from Brittany and who supported Henry of Trastámara, the first King of Castile and León in the period 1365-1370. Ernest Constant Declercq is the great-grandfather of Nico F. Declercq.

References

External links 
 
 
 
 The Academic Family Tree

Georgia Tech faculty
Living people
1975 births
Ghent University alumni
Catholic University of Leuven alumni
Belgian physicists